PW-Sat2 is a CubeSat satellite constructed by the Faculty of Power and Aeronautical Engineering of Warsaw University of Technology in cooperation with the Space Research Centre of the Polish Academy of Sciences.

Development of PW-Sat2 begun in September 2013 with launch planned for 2017. Eventually, it was launched on 3 December 2018 on the SpaceX Falcon9 rocket, with the goal to test deorbit sail. It deorbited as planned on 23 February 2021.

See also

PW-Sat
BRITE
Lem (BRITE-PL)
Heweliusz (BRITE-PL)

References

CubeSats
Student satellites
Spacecraft launched in 2018
Satellites of Poland
Polish inventions
2018 in Poland